Ilkeston is a town and unparished area in the Borough of Erewash in Derbyshire, England. The town and surrounding area contain 29 listed buildings that are recorded in the National Heritage List for England. Of these, one is listed at Grade I, the highest of the three grades, three are at Grade II*, the middle grade, and the others are at Grade II, the lowest grade.  The Erewash Canal passes through the area, and the listed buildings associated with it are two bridges and two locks.  The other listed buildings include churches and a chapel, a church tower, houses, a museum, the town hall, two factories, a drinking fountain, a brick kiln, a library, cemetery buildings, two cinemas, a school, a railway viaduct, and two war memorials.


Key

Buildings

References

Citations

Sources

 

Lists of listed buildings in Derbyshire
Ilkeston